The England cricket team toured Ireland in May 2019 to play a one-off One Day International (ODI) match. The match took place ahead of Ireland's visit to England in July 2019, to play a one-off four-day Test match. In September 2018, The Village in Malahide was named as the venue for the match. The ODI fixture was part of England's preparation for the 2019 Cricket World Cup. England won the one-off ODI match by four wickets.

In addition to the provisional World Cup squad, Jofra Archer and Chris Jordan were named in England's squads for this match and the subsequent series against Pakistan, and were in contention for a place in the World Cup side depending on their performances. England finalised their fifteen-man World Cup squad following the conclusion of the matches against Pakistan.

Squads

After the England squad was announced, Sam Billings suffered a dislocated shoulder which ruled him out of the match. He was replaced by Ben Foakes. Alex Hales was dropped from England's squad, following a 21-day ban for using recreational drugs. Jason Roy and Mark Wood were also withdrawn prior to the match and were replaced by Ben Duckett and Dawid Malan. The day before the match, Mark Adair was added to Ireland's squad, replacing Stuart Thompson, who was ruled out due to injury.

Only ODI

References

External links
 Series home at ESPN Cricinfo

2019 in English cricket
2019 in Irish cricket
International cricket competitions in 2019
English cricket tours of Ireland